Miss World 1972, the 22nd edition of the Miss World pageant, was held at the Royal Albert Hall in London, UK on 1 December 1972 on BBC. Fifty-three delegates vied for the crown won by Belinda Green of Australia. Green became the second Australian winner of the crown in just four years. Since the reigning Miss World 1971 had suffered a broken arm and was unable to travel to London, Mrs. Julia Morley crowned the new Miss World 1972.

Results

Contestants
Miss World 1972 had a total of 53 contestants. Seven contestants did not arrive on time, and were disqualified from the event.

  – Cynthia Shange
  – Olga Edith Cognini Ferrer
  – Sandra Werleman
  – Belinda Green 
  – Ursula Pacher 
  – Heather Cleare
  – Anne-Marie Roger
  – Helen Brown
  – Agnes Motswere Letsebe
  – Ângela Maria Favi
  – Bonny Brady
  – María Victoria Ross González
  – Teresa Evangelina Medrano
  – Patricia Falconí
  – Tuula Anneli Björkling 
  – Claudine Cassereau 
  – Heidemarie Renate Weber
  – Rosemarie Vivian Catania
  – Helen Lykissa
  – Maria Louise Pangelinan
  – Monique Borgeld
  – Doris van Tuyl
  – Gay Mei-Lin
  – Rósa Helgadóttir
  – Malathi Basappa 
  – Pauline Therese Fitzsimons
  – Hanna Urdan
  – Laura Romano
  – Gail Geraldeen Phillips
  – Akiko Kajitani
  – Cecelia Armena King
  – Janet Mok Swee Chin
  – Jane Attard
  – Marie Ange Bestel
  – Gloria Gutiérrez López
  – Kristine Dayle Allan
  – Ingeborg Marie Sorensen 
  – Rosa Angélica Mussi
  – Evangeline Rosales Reyes
  – Anita Marques
  – Ana Nisi Goyco †
  – Jane Edna Straevens
  – Rosalind Lee Eng Neo
  – Stephanie Elizabeth Reinecke
  – María del Rocío Martín Madrigal
  – Rita Berntsson
  – Astrid Vollenweider
  – Jintana Jitsophon
  – Feyzal Kibarer
  – Jennifer Mary McAdam 
  – Lynda Carter 
  – Amalia Heller Gómez
  – Biljana Ristić

Judges
A panel of judges evaluated the contestants' performances. Peter Sellers was one of the judges.

Notes

Debuts

Returns

Last competed in 1968:
 
Last competed in 1969:
 
Last competed in 1970:

No Shows and Did not compete
  - Martha Lucia Cardozo Cruz
  - Maria Koutrouza
  - Chung Keum-ok
  - Regina Melgar de Garcia (arrived November 30th, too late to compete)
  - Helga Vera Johns, Miss Rhodesia 1972 was not allowed to compete despite having British citizenship. She would later try to compete again in 1975 as Miss South Africa but was barred again because she hadn't lived in South Africa for at least 5 years as per the requirements for the Miss World Organization.

References

External links
 Pageantopolis – Miss World 1972

Miss World
1972 in London
1972 beauty pageants
Beauty pageants in the United Kingdom
Events at the Royal Albert Hall
December 1972 events in Europe